The Nasdaq Helsinki, formerly known as the Helsinki Stock Exchange, is a stock exchange located in Helsinki, Finland. Since 3 September 2003, it has been part of Nasdaq Nordic (previously called OMX). After the OMX merger, it was referred to as OMX Helsinki (OMXH), then after NASDAQ's acquisition of OMX in February 2008, NASDAQ OMX Helsinki, and currently Nasdaq Helsinki.

History 

The Helsinki Stock Exchange saw its first transaction on October 7, 1912. From then it remained a "free form" financial association until in 1984 it was converted into a cooperative owned mostly by banks, traders, other companies and associations.

On April 1, 1990, trading was moved to a new digital system: HETI (Helsinki Stock Exchange Automated Trading and Information System, and in Finnish a rough backronym for "immediately"), which replaced the electro-mechanical trading board originally introduced back in 1935. HETI enabled remote traders to conduct transactions on equal terms with those in the trading room.

The cooperative changed to a limited liability company (Helsingin Arvopaperipörssi) in the fall of 1995 and merged with several clearing and stock deposit companies and associations at the beginning of 1997. During 1997 and 1998 the Stock Exchange bought both of the Finnish derivative exchanges and merged them with itself to become HEX. In November 1998 HEX merged with Arvopaperikeskus to form Helsinki Exchanges Group Plc, which then changed its name to HEX Plc in the spring of 2001. In 2001 and 2002 HEX acquired a majority share of the Tallinn Stock Exchange and the Riga Stock Exchange.

On 3 September 2003, HEX Plc merged with OM AB, owner of the Stockholm Stock Exchange, to become OM HEX. A year later, the company was renamed to OMX.

OMX Helsinki 25 (OMXH25) is a stock market index for the Helsinki Stock Exchange. It is a market value weighted index that consists of the 25 most-traded stock classes. OMXH25 is also known  by its old name, HEX25. As of March 2006, there are two exchange-traded funds listed, both are index funds for the OMXH25 index.

In April 2006, the Stock Exchange announced the trading will be done in round lot sizes of one share starting from September 25, 2006. Previously trading was done in round lot sizes that varied from listed company to company.

Hours
Normal trading sessions are from 10:00am to 6:30pm on all days of the week except Saturdays, Sundays and holidays declared by the Exchange in advance.

Trading rules
A special feature of Helsinki Exchange is that limit orders are not allowed to cross over. For an effective market order, the unfilled portion of the order becomes a limit order when it stays at the execution price.

See also
Stock market lists
Nasdaq Copenhagen
Nasdaq Stockholm
Nasdaq Nordic
Nasdaq Vilnius
Nasdaq Riga
Nasdaq Tallinn
Nasdaq Iceland
Nasdaq First North

Other lists
 List of Finnish companies
 List of Ålandic companies

References

External links 

Nasdaq OMX Nordic homepage 
Companies listed on Nasdaq Helsinki 

Financial services companies established in 1912
1912 establishments in Finland
Economy of Finland
Buildings and structures in Helsinki
Economy of Helsinki
Stock exchanges in Europe
Helsinki
Nasdaq Nordic
Financial services companies of Finland
Kluuvi